The Sanctuary Forest is a non-profit conservation land trust in the Mattole River headwaters on the northern California coast.  It was established in 1987 as a community effort to preserve a 2000-year-old redwood named “Big Red." It also contains spawning grounds for king salmon and steelhead in a tributary of the river.  

It currently covers over 10,000 acres of forest, rivers and wildlife corridors in California.

History 
Sanctuary Forest began in 1987, within the temperate rainforest of the headwaters of the Mattole River, on the northern California coast.  Active community members who aimed to preserve the 2,000-year-old redwood, “Big Red," that was scheduled for cutting by industrial timberland owners, launched Sanctuary Forest’s first campaign.  

The origin of this organization is based on the beliefs of the Redwoods Monastery, a group of Cistercian monastic women, who educated their communities on the severe threats logging has towards the environment.

Conservation efforts
Its conservation efforts are to preserve old growth Douglas firs, redwood forests, wildlife corridors, and additional habitats and streams near the Mattole River. It has guided efforts to save 1,200 acres of old-growth forest, 4,440 acres of land for conservation purposes, and 6,075 acres of conservation easements on private property.

In 2017, Sanctuary Forest, Inc. implemented the Whitethorn Clean Up Project to address impacts to Sanctuary Forest as a result of a trespass marijuana cultivation site from 2014 to 2016. 

Sanctuary Forest, Inc. has worked for years to purchase land within the Whitethorn Valley in efforts to conserve the land and protect it from future development.

Programs
Sanctuary Forest’s programs include Lands Conservation Program, Stewardship Program, Education and Outreach Program and Collaboration Program:

Lands conservation program 
The Lands Conservation Program protects the main areas that help keep the Mattole River healthy through conservation easements and land acquisition.

Stewardship program 
The Stewardship Program establishes ecologically sound land management by restoration, water conservation, and other projects.

Education and outreach program 
The Education and Outreach Program promotes public appreciation for the land by providing summer hikes and scholarships.

Collaboration program 
Collaboration Program unify different perspectives with the same purpose of keeping the Mattole watershed healthy, through making partnerships to promote conservation and responsible management of the environment.  

It includes the Upper Mattole River and Forest Cooperative (UMRFC), which involves public, private, federal, state and non-profit organizations that manage 4,000 acres of Mattole River headwaters as part of a threatened salmon location. Sanctuary Forest is the non-profit land conservation group that was active in conserving this area in collaboration with the UMRFC.  It is estimated that the Sanctuary Forest owns around 500 acres within the UMRFC.

References 

Land trusts in California
Forests of California
Environmental organizations based in California